Jamaican Heroes is a 1980 reggae album by Prince Far I. The musicians included Roots Radics and The Flying Lizards. The album was mixed by Anthony "Crucial Bunny" Graham at Studio One, Jamaica. The cover was designed by Jill Mumfield.

Prince Far I uses the "Satta" riddim for "Deck of Life", which is a version of the song "Deck of Cards" that he recorded for Joe Gibbs. He uses Winston Riley’s "Stalag" riddim for "The Vision". "Golden Throne" is underpinned by Burning Spear’s ominous "He Prayed" riddim. The song "Musical History" is filled with criticism of the lyrics of the then deejays, such as Yellowman and General Echo. Their lyrics were just ‘gimmicks’, in contrast to his lyrics that tackled sensitive themes on the social, political and human spheres.

Track listing
All tracks composed by Michael Williams; except where indicated
"Deck of Life" (Michael Williams, T. Tyler)
"The Vision"
"Natty Champion"
"Read  Chapter"
"Golden Throne"
"Jamaican Heroes"
"Prison Discipline"
"Musical History"
"Jah Will Provide"

Personnel
Lincoln "Style" Scott, Sly Dunbar - drums 
Errol "Flabba" Holt, Robbie Shakespeare - bass guitar
Bingy Bunny - rhythm guitar
Noel "Sowell" Bailey - lead guitar 
Gladstone Anderson - piano
Winston Wright - organ
Prince Far I - percussion
Basheba, Vivien Goldman, Ari Up, Errol "Flabba" Holt - backing vocals
Kalimba, David Toop - flute
Steve Beresford - toy piano, toy synthesizer, whistles, melodica, various noises
Technical
Anthony "Crucial Bunny" Graham - engineer
Dave Hunt, Prince Far I - mixing
Jill Mumford - cover
"Special Thanks To : Roots Radics and Flying Lizards"

References

Prince Far I albums
1980 albums
Trojan Records albums